Mat (Latin: Mathis) is a municipality in Dibër County, northern Albania. It was created in 2015 by the merger of the present municipalities Baz, Burrel, Derjan, Komsi, Lis, Macukull, Rukaj and Ulëz. The seat of the municipality is the town Burrel. The total population is 27,600 (2011 census), in a total area of 493.81 km2.

Etymology
The Albanian name mat originally meant "elevated location", "mountain place". Today's meaning in Albanian, "river bank, river shore", is a consequence of a secondary change through the common use of both the terms mal, "mountain" and breg, "shore", giving the meaning of "elevation". The river Mat was recorded by Roman writer Vibius Sequester (4th or 5th century AD) as Mathis, following a hellenized graphic mode of the term mat. It appeared in written records also as Mathia in 1380. Historical linguistic considerations suggest that Mat and the surrounding regions, including Mirdita, have been among the oldest settlements of the Albanians after their ethnogenesis, which is considered to have been completed between the 2nd and the 5th–6th centuries AD.

Overview

The municipality is located on the middle part of the Mat river's course. It encompasses the northern part of the former Mat District; the southern part is now part of Klos. The territory is largely composed of mountains and hills, which has only been opened up by National Road 6, which links the coastal town of Milot with Peshkopi.

The area is bounded by mountain ranges to the east and west. The Mat river is dammed in two locations in the area, forming Lake Ulzë and the smaller Lake Shkopeti. The municipality also contains the Zall Gjoçaj National Park.

King Zog of Albania's grandfather was from Mat.

Sources

Citations

Bibliography

Municipalities in Dibër County
 
Administrative units of Mat (municipality)